The 1977 U.S. Clay Court Championships was a tennis tournament that was part of the men's Grand Prix and women's Colgate Series circuits. It was held in Indianapolis in the United States and played on outdoor clay courts at the Indianapolis Racquet Club. It was the 9th edition of the tournament in the Open Era and was held from August 8 through August 14, 1977. Second-seeded Manuel Orantes won the men's singles title and the accompanying $17,500 first-prize money.

Finals

Men's singles

 Manuel Orantes defeated  Jimmy Connors 6–1, 6–3

Women's singles

 Laura duPont defeated  Nancy Richey 6–4, 6–3

Men's doubles

 Patricio Cornejo /  Jaime Fillol defeated  Dick Crealy /  Cliff Letcher 6–7, 6–4, 6–3

Women's doubles

 Linky Boshoff /  Ilana Kloss defeated  Mary Carillo /  Wendy Overton 5–7, 7–5, 6–3

References

External links 
 ATP tournament profile
 ITF tournament details

 
U.S. Clay Court Championships
U.S. Clay Court Championships
U.S. Clay Court Championships
U.S. Clay Court Championships